Saint-Jacques-des-Guérets is a commune in the Loir-et-Cher department in central France.

Population

Sights
Lying on one of the traditional pilgrimage routes to Santiago da Compostella, across the river from the partly troglodyte hillside of Trôo, its small church of St. James the Great is celebrated for its Romanesque frescoes and western arch.

See also
 Trôo
 Bas-Vendômois
 Communes of the Loir-et-Cher department

References

Communes of Loir-et-Cher